The United Nations General Assembly Third Committee (also known as the Social, Humanitarian and Cultural Committee or SOCHUM or C3) is one of six main committees at the General Assembly of the United Nations. It deals with human rights, humanitarian affairs and social matters.

The Third Committee meets every year in early October and aims to finish its work by the end of November. All 193 member states of the UN can attend. As in previous sessions, an important part of the work of the committee will focus on the examination of human rights questions, including reports of the special procedures of the Human Rights Council which was established in 2006.

Mandate 
The work of the committee focuses on human rights, humanitarian affairs and social issues. In addition, it also considers issues relating to:
 The advancement of women
 The protection of children
 the protection of indigenous populations, and related issues
 The treatment of refugees, and related issues such as racism and discrimination 
 The promotion of fundamental freedoms
 The right to self-determination
 Youth, family and ageing
 The rights of persons with disabilities
 Crime prevention and criminal justice 
 The international drug trade, and related issues

Working methods
The work of the Third Committee begins in early October and is usually finished by the end of November.

Unlike most other bodies of the General Assembly, the work of the Third Committee does not begin with a general debate between its members. Instead, its agenda items are debated individually from the beginning of the session.

The Third Committee hosts interactive dialogues with the High Commissioner for Human Rights and the High Commissioner for Refugees each year.

Current state 
In its 75th Session, the committee will focus on:

 Promotion of sustained economic growth and sustainable development in accordance with the relevant resolutions of the General Assembly and recent United Nations conferences
 Social development
 Advancement of women
 Maintenance of international peace and security
 Report  of  the  United  Nations  High  Commissioner  for  Refugees,  questions relating to refugees, returnees and displaced persons and humanitarian questions
 Promotion of human rights
 Report of the Human Rights Council
 Promotion and protection of the rights of children
 Rights of indigenous peoples
 Elimination of racism, racial discrimination, xenophobia and related intolerance 
 Right of peoples to self-determination
 Promotion and protection of human rights
 Drug control, crime prevention and combating international terrorism in all its forms and manifestations
 Crime prevention and criminal justice
 Countering the use of information and communications technologies for criminal purposes
 International drug control

Bureau
The following make up the bureau of the Third Committee for the 75th Session of the General Assembly:

See also 
 United Nations General Assembly First Committee
 United Nations General Assembly Second Committee
 United Nations General Assembly Fourth Committee
 United Nations General Assembly Fifth Committee
 United Nations General Assembly Sixth Committee

References

External links 
 Third Committee for Social, Humanitarian & Cultural Issues, UN.org
 Six Committees of the United Nations General Assembly, UN.org

Human rights organizations
3